The National Renewal Alliance (Portuguese: Aliança Renovadora Nacional, ARENA) was a far-right political party that existed in Brazil between 1966 and 1979. It was the official party of the military dictatorship that ruled Brazil from 1964 to 1985.

ARENA was part of a two-party system enforced by the dictatorship instituted in 1966, where only it and the Brazilian Democratic Movement (MDB) — the "consented opposition" — were allowed. In 1979, a multi-party system was reintroduced to Brazil, both MDB and ARENA were officially dissolved, and the Democratic Social Party (PDS) was founded as a continuation of ARENA. Soon thereafter, PDS had a split which saw the creation of the Liberal Front Party (PFL), current Brazil Union (UNIÃO), while PDS merged with the PDC in 1993 became the Reform Progressive Party (PPR), which became the current Progressives (PP) in 1995.

History
Until 1965, there were three main parties in Brazil: the populist Brazilian Labour Party (PTB), the centrist Social Democratic Party (PSD) and the conservative National Democratic Union (UDN). In 1964, the government of President João Goulart was overthrown by a military coup d'etat, but in contrast to other Latin American dictatorships, the Brazilian military-controlled government did not abolish Congress. Instead, in 1965, the government banned all existing political parties and created a two-party system.  ARENA, the pro-government party, was formed by politicians from the bulk of the UDN, the right wing of the PSD, and the bulk of the integralist Party of Popular Representation. The main body of the PSD joined most of the PTB in forming the Brazilian Democratic Movement (MDB), the opposition.

ARENA had no real ideology other than support for the military, who used it mostly to rubber-stamp its agenda. In the elections of 1966 and 1970, ARENA won a vast majority of seats. Most agree that, at first, the MDB did not have any chance to pass or block any legislation. It also rubber-stamped the military leadership's choice of president. Under the military's constitution, the president was nominally elected by an absolute majority of both chambers meeting in joint session. In practice, ARENA's majority was so massive that its candidate could not possibly be defeated.  During most of the early part of the military regime, Brazil was, for all intents and purposes, a one-party state. Indeed, during the first two elections under military rule, the MDB didn't even put up a presidential candidate.

However, ARENA was not completely subservient. For example, in the late 1968 President Artur da Costa e Silva demanded that Congress prosecute the congressman Márcio Moreira Alves for suggesting that women should refuse to dance with military cadets. Congress turned the demand down, prompting Costa e Silva to issue the heavy-handed Fifth Institutional Act, which allowed him to close Congress and rule by decree. Almost as soon as he signed AI-5 into law, Costa e Silva used its provisions to close Congress for almost two years, thus placing Brazil under a tight dictatorship.

Despite the large volume of studies on the Brazilian military dictatorship, little is known about ARENA. There are historical doubts about the formation of the party, the reasons for the adhesion of most UDN members to ARENA, the ideological currents that permeated the ARENA party program and the extent to which ARENA was independent from the military.

In the 1974 legislative elections, MDB took many more seats than expected. It actually won a majority in the Senate, and came up just short of a majority in the Chamber of Deputies. The government reacted by decreeing the recess of the National Congress and editing on April 13, 1977 a set of constitutional amendments and decree-laws known as April Package (Pacote de Abril) which provided for the appointment of a third of senators, extended the presidential term to six years, restricted opposition power and even succeeded in annulling the mandates of some Congressmen of the MDB.

In 1979, in a manoeuvre to divide the opposition, the government ended the bipartisan party system, and ARENA was dissolved when the new political parties law became effective on 20 December 1979. In January 1980, most of ARENA's former members founded the Democratic Social Party (PDS) as a continuation of ARENA.

Electoral history

Presidential elections

Chamber of Deputies elections

Senate elections

Notorious members

References 

Defunct political parties in Brazil
Political parties established in 1965
Conservative parties in Brazil
National conservative parties
Military dictatorship in Brazil
1965 establishments in Brazil
Political parties disestablished in 1979
1979 disestablishments in Brazil
Far-right political parties
Far-right political parties in Brazil